Euchlaena madusaria, the scrub euchlaena moth, is a species of moth of the  family Geometridae. It is found in North America, where it has been recorded from British Columbia, east to Nova Scotia, south to Florida, Missouri and Oregon. The habitat consists of dry woodlands. The species is listed as threatened in Connecticut.

The wingspan is about 28 mm. The ground colour of the forewings is yellow-tan with fine but well-defined antemedial, postmedial and subterminal lines. The outer third is darker. Adults are mainly on wing from May to August.

The larvae are reported to feed on various trees, including oak and blueberry.

Subspecies
Euchlaena madusaria madusaria
Euchlaena madusaria ochrearia McDunnough, 1940

References

Moths described in 1860
Angeronini